The Southern Inspectorate of Greenland also known as South Greenland was a Danish inspectorate on Greenland consisting of the trading centers and missionary stations along the southwest coast of the island. Its capital was at Godthaab (modern Nuuk). The northernmost town of South Greenland was Holsteinborg, which bordered Egedesminde, which was the southernmost town of North Greenland. This boundary between South and North Greenland ran at around 68°N degree of latitude, and in the South, South Greenland stretched to 59°30'N, or to the southernmost point of Greenland.

In 1911, as the administration of the colony was removed from the Royal Greenland Trading Department and folded into the Danish Ministry of the Interior, a provincial council was established. It was elected indirectly from the local councils and had little say in the management of the colony.

It was united with North Greenland in 1950.

See also
 List of inspectors of South Greenland, for the chief officers of the colony between 1782 and 1924
 List of governors of South Greenland, for the chief officers of the colony between 1924 and 1950
 North Greenland
 New South Greenland

References

Former populated places in Greenland
Former Danish colonies
States and territories disestablished in 1950
1950 disestablishments in North America
20th-century disestablishments in Greenland